Monterey Center is an unincorporated community in Allegan County, Michigan, United States.

History
Monterey Center was settled in 1833.  By 1873, the population was 175, and the settlement had a general store, hotel, and wagon maker.  Produce and lumber were the chief industries.

References

Unincorporated communities in Allegan County, Michigan
Unincorporated communities in Michigan